Carol Knight is an American former slalom canoeist who competed in the 1970s. She won a gold medal in the mixed C-2 event at the 1973 ICF Canoe Slalom World Championships in Muotathal.

References
ICF medalists for Olympic and World Championships - Part 2: rest of flatwater (now sprint) and remaining canoeing disciplines: 1936-2007.

American female canoeists
Possibly living people
Year of birth missing (living people)
Medalists at the ICF Canoe Slalom World Championships